Ettore Maestranzi (1 February 1914 – 1 July 1966) was a Swiss racing cyclist. He rode in the 1939 Tour de France.

References

1914 births
1966 deaths
Swiss male cyclists
Place of birth missing